Dieudonne Dolassem (born 4 September 1979) is a Cameroonian judoka. He competed at the 2012 Summer Olympics in the -90 kg event and lost in the first round to Varlam Liparteliani.

References

External links 
 

Cameroonian male judoka
1979 births
Living people
Olympic judoka of Cameroon
Judoka at the 2012 Summer Olympics
Sportspeople from Yaoundé
Commonwealth Games competitors for Cameroon
Judoka at the 2014 Commonwealth Games
African Games bronze medalists for Cameroon
African Games medalists in judo
Competitors at the 2015 African Games
Competitors at the 2019 African Games
20th-century Cameroonian people
21st-century Cameroonian people